The following is a list of seasons completed by the Campbell Fighting Camels football team. Based in Buies Creek, North Carolina, the Camels currently compete in the Big South Conference of the NCAA Division I FCS. The Camels joined the conference in 2018. Previously, Campbell was a member of the non-scholarship Pioneer League. Since the program's inception in 2008, Campbell has had two head football coaches, the first of which was Dale Steele, who led the team through its first five seasons and attained a 14–41 overall record. Steele was replaced in 2012 by Mike Minter who most recently completed his tenth season as head coach of the Camels.

Seasons

References

Campbell
Campbell Fighting Camels football seasons